WECA may refer to:

West of England Combined Authority
 Wi-Fi Alliance
 UDP-N-acetylglucosamine—undecaprenyl-phosphate N-acetylglucosaminephosphotransferase, an enzyme
 UDP-N-acetylglucosamine—decaprenyl-phosphate N-acetylglucosaminephosphotransferase, an enzyme
 WECA-LP, a low-power radio station (105.7 FM) licensed to Palm Bay, Florida, United States